Defendory is a bi-annual international trade show for the defence industry held in Greece. It is organised in the grounds of Athens’s Ellinikon International Airport, that became defunct following the construction of the New Athens International Airport in Spata.  

It was first staged in 1980 and the 2008 show will be the 17th successive event. Army, Navy and Air Force defence equipment are on display. It is organised by the Greek Institute of Industrial Exhibitions and the Hellenic Ministry of National Defense.

External links
 Defendory Homepage

Arms fairs
Trade fairs in Greece
Economy of Athens